Dead City Dreaming is Crystal Eyes' fifth album released in 2006 by Heavy Fidelity. The first track, Dead City Dreaming, concerns the Cthulhu mythos.

Track listing
"Dead City Dreaming" - 4:43 
"Into the Light" - 3:42
"The Narrow Mind" - 4:06
"Wall of Stars" - 4:58
"Battlefield" - 4:14
"The Quest Remains" - 3:28
"Dawn Dancer" - 4:27
"Roads of Loneliness" - 3:55
"Temple of Immortal Shame" - 4:23
"The Halls of Valhalla" - 7:19

Credits
Søren Nico Adamsen - Vocals
Mikael Dahl - Guitar
Niclas Karsson - Guitar
Claes Wikander - Bass Guitar
Stefan Svantesson - Drums
Production and recording by Mikael Dahl at Crystal Sounds
Mixing by Fredrik Nordström
Mastering by Göran Finnberg
Cover artwork by Mattias Norén

2006 albums
Crystal Eyes albums